The following is a list of the Sweden national futsal team all official international matches.

2012–13

2013–14

2014–15

2015–16

2016–17

2017–18

2018–19

2019–20

Sources
 Official page

results